Edward Wojda (26 July 1941, in Żyliny – 21 March 1990, in Gdańsk) was a Polish wrestler who competed in the 1968 Summer Olympics and in the 1972 Summer Olympics.

References

1941 births
1990 deaths
Olympic wrestlers of Poland
Wrestlers at the 1968 Summer Olympics
Wrestlers at the 1972 Summer Olympics
Polish male sport wrestlers
People from Suwałki County
Sportspeople from Podlaskie Voivodeship
20th-century Polish people